Bynther is a village in the Mairang block of Eastern West Khasi Hills District in Meghalaya, India. The village is divided into mainly two parts: Upper Bynther and Lower Bynther. The famous folk singer Skendrowell Syiemlieh lived here.

References 

Villages in Eastern West Khasi Hills district